Redouane Cheïkh Benzerga (born November 8, 1972 in Oran) is a retired Algerian international football player.

Career
Benzerga represented Algeria at the 1998 African Cup of Nations.

Honours
 Won the Arab Cup Winners' Cup twice with MC Oran in 1997 and 1998
 Won the Arab Super Cup once with MC Oran in 1999

External links
 DZFoot Profile
 National team stats

1972 births
1998 African Cup of Nations players
Algerian footballers
Algeria international footballers
ASM Oran players
WA Tlemcen players
MC Oran players
MC Alger players
GC Mascara players
Footballers from Oran
Living people
Association football midfielders
21st-century Algerian people